Cordele is a city in and the county seat of Crisp County, Georgia. The population was 11,147 at the 2010 census.

Cordele calls itself the watermelon capital of the world.

History

19th century
Cordele was incorporated on January 1, 1888, and named for Cordelia Hawkins, eldest daughter of Colonel Samuel Hawkins, the president of the Savannah, Americus and Montgomery Railway.

In November 1864, the area that is now Cordele served as the temporary capital of Georgia. During the last days of the Confederacy, Georgia's war governor Joseph E. Brown used his rural farmhouse to escape the wrath of Sherman's March to the Sea. During that time, the farmhouse, which Brown called "Dooly County Place," served as the official capital for only a few days. It was replaced in 1890 by the Suwanee Hotel, located in what became downtown Cordele. The hotel was destroyed by a fire in late 1994 and was rebuilt.

Cordele was founded in 1888 by J.E.D. Shipp of Americus. The town was located at the junction of two major railroads – the Savannah, Americus & Montgomery line, and the Georgia Southern & Florida. As the railroads brought more people and business to the newly settled territory, Cordele experienced phenomenal growth. Before 1905 Cordele was located in southern Dooly County,  from the county seat in Vienna.

20th century
With Cordele's continued progress, many in the community felt the need for a seat of government to be closer than Vienna. Crisp County was formed in 1905 by taking a portion of southern Dooly County, and Cordele became its county seat.

By 1915, Cordele was home to several industries including an ice-making plant, mills for processing cotton products into cloth and oil, a fertilizer factory, and other small manufacturing outfits.

By August 1930, Cordele housed the Crisp County Hydroelectric System, the first county-owned electric system. Located on the Flint River, the hydroelectric plant continues to operate, and the resulting Lake Blackshear has attracted residents to its waterfront properties.

On April 2, 1936, a tornado struck Cordele, killing 23 people.

Geography
Cordele is located north of the center of Crisp County at  (31.964178, -83.777277). U.S. Route 41 passes through the city as Seventh Street and leads north  to Vienna and south  to Ashburn. U.S. Route 280 (16th Avenue) crosses US 41 in the center of the city and leads east  to Abbeville and west  to Americus.

Climate
Cordele has a humid subtropical climate (Köppen climate classification Cfa), with mild winters and hot, humid summers.

Demographics

2020 census

As of the 2020 United States census, there were 10,220 people, 3,874 households, and 2,453 families residing in the city.

2000 census
As of the census of 2000, there were 11,608 people, 4,303 households, and 2,839 families residing in the city. The racial makeup of the city was 31.90% White, 65.03% African American, 0.06% Native American, 0.84% Asian, 0.06% Pacific Islander, 1.19% from other races, and 0.91% from two or more races. Hispanic or Latino of any race were 1.95% of the population.

There were 4,303 households, out of which 35.4% had children under the age of 18 living with them, 31.1% were married couples living together, 30.8% had a female householder with no husband present, and 34.0% were non-families. 30.3% of all households were made up of individuals, and 13.9% had someone living alone who was 65 years of age or older.  The average household size was 2.59 and the average family size was 3.22.

In the city, the population was spread out, with 31.6% under the age of 18, 10.2% from 18 to 24, 25.6% from 25 to 44, 18.1% from 45 to 64, and 14.5% who were 65 years of age or older.  The median age was 31 years. For every 100 females, there were 81.7 males.  For every 100 females age 18 and over, there were 74.9 males.

The median income for a household in the city was $17,615, and the median income for a family was $21,677. Males had a median income of $23,253 versus $17,282 for females. The per capita income for the city was $12,746.  About 38.1% of families and 41.6% of the population were below the poverty line, including 59.2% of those under age 18 and 26.7% of those age 65 or over.

Cordele City Commissioners
Five citizens of Cordele are elected to serve as the City Commissioners.

The current Cordele City Commissioners are:
Jeanie Bartee,
Wesley Rainey,
Royce Reeves,
Vesta Beal Shephard, and
Chairman John Wiggins

Representation in the Georgia State Legislature
In the Georgia State Senate, the City of Cordele is represented by Sen. Carden Summers.
In the Georgia House of Representatives, the City of Cordele is represented by Rep. Noel Williams Jr.

Representation in the United States House of Representatives
In the United States House of Representatives, the City of Cordele is represented by Rep. Sanford Bishop.

Georgia Veterans State Park
 

To the west of Cordele town centre and located on Route 280 is the large Georgia Veterans State Park, which lies on the eastern edge of Lake Blackshear. This facility includes campgrounds, a resort hotel, and a golf course. There are also interesting displays of preserved military aircraft and helicopters and army tanks and other fighting vehicles. These displays are open to public viewing during daylight hours

Arts and culture

Cordele was featured in the eighteenth episode of the Small Town News Podcast, an improv comedy podcast that takes listeners on a fun and silly virtual trip to a small town in America each week, in which the hosts improvise scenes inspired by local newspaper stories.

Annual cultural events
Cordele hosts an annual Watermelon Festival each June.

Museums and other points of interest

In 1968 a Titan I missile was erected by the Rotary Club of Cordele at the intersection of I-75 and U.S. 280 East.

Sports
Cordele is home to Crisp Motorsports Park, a 3/8-mile asphalt oval.  It is home to the annual pre-season race known as SpeedFest, which is sanctioned by the Champion Racing Association (CRA) organization and run in late January.  The event features a 125-lap race for the CRA Jegs All-Star Tour (crate late models) and a 200-lap race for the ARCA/CRA Super Series (super late models).

Education

Crisp County School District 
The Crisp County School District holds pre-school to grade twelve, and consists of four elementary schools, a middle school, and a high school. The district has 266 full-time teachers and over 4,337 students.
Crisp County Primary
Crisp County pre-k
Crisp County Elementary School
Crisp County Middle School
Crisp County High School

Infrastructure

Major highways
 Interstate 75 / SR 401
 U.S. Route 41 /  State Route 7
 U.S. Route 280 /  State Route 30
 State Route 33
 State Route 90
 State Route 257
 State Route 300 (Georgia-Florida Parkway)

The Cordele Inland Port is operated by a private company, Cordele Intermodal Services, which offers rail service via the Heart of Georgia Railroad and Georgia Central Railroad, from their rail ramp in Cordele to the Georgia Ports Authority in Savannah. Two class I railroads CSX and Norfolk Southern pass through Cordele. Shortline Railroad, Heart of Georgia currently interchanges with CSX in downtown Cordele.

Notable people

 Buster Brown, blues and R&B singer born in Cordele
 Preston Dennard, former wide receiver for the Los Angeles Rams
 Janie Lou Gibbs, serial killer who poisoned her husband, three sons, and grandson. She was convicted in 1967.
 Mac Hyman, fiction writer known for his best-selling novel No Time for Sergeants and Take Now Thy Son; born in Cordele and a lifelong resident
 T. J. Jackson, Olympian and NFL wide receiver
 Marcus Lamb, president of international Christian TV network Daystar
 Arthur Lucas, convicted murderer and one of the last two people to be executed in Canada
 Deworski Odom, sprinter; born in Cordele
 Jody Powell, served as the White House Press Secretary under President Jimmy Carter; born in Cordele
 Andre Ramsey, offensive lineman for the Buffalo Bills
 Tree Rollins, former NBA basketball player and Cordele native who attended Crisp County High School
 Quay Walker, linebacker for the Green Bay Packers
 Joe Williams, jazz singer and Cosby Show grandfather; born in Cordele
 Noel Williams Jr. - Insurance agent and politician.
Deborah Woodson, singer and author; born in Cordele

Bibliography
Ogden, Bob. Aviation Museums and Collections of North America. Air-Britain (Historians) Ltd. Tonbridge, Kent. 2007. .

References

External links
 
 City of Cordele official website
 Cordele Dispatch, local newspaper
 O'Neal Historic District
 Cordele, Georgia, at City-Data.com

Cities in Georgia (U.S. state)
Cities in Crisp County, Georgia
Micropolitan areas of Georgia (U.S. state)
County seats in Georgia (U.S. state)
Populated places established in 1888
1888 establishments in Georgia (U.S. state)